Barys Pukhouski (born 3 January 1987) is a Belarusian handball player for RK Vojvodina and the Belarusian national team.

References

External links

1987 births
Living people
Belarusian male handball players
Expatriate handball players
Belarusian expatriate sportspeople in Hungary
Belarusian expatriate sportspeople in Ukraine
HC Motor Zaporizhia players
People from Malaryta District
Sportspeople from Brest Region